Sir Clement Cotterell (1585–1631) was an English courtier and politician, who sat in the House of Commons from 1621 to 1624.

Political career
Cotterell became lord of the manor of Wilsford, Lincolnshire through his marriage with the heiress Anne Alleyne, daughter of Henry Alleyne of Wilsford.

In 1616 Cotterell was appointed muster master by the Duke of Buckingham. He was confirmed in the office of groom-porter to King James on 10 July 1620 and knighted at Whitehall on 26 December 1620. Cotterell also had a grant to oversee and issue licences for activities such as card games, bowling alleys and tennis courts.

Cotterell served as a Vice-Admiral of Lincolnshire from 1620 to 1631. In 1621, he was elected Member of Parliament for Grantham. In 1624 he was re-elected MP for Grantham and elected also for Boston, but chose to remain with Grantham.
 
Cotterell's son Charles by Anne Alleyne became Master of Ceremonies.

References

English MPs 1621–1622
English MPs 1624–1625
Cotterell family
1585 births
1631 deaths